In enzymology, a 2-hydroxy-3-oxoadipate synthase is an enzyme that catalyzes the following chemical reaction:

2-oxoglutarate + glyoxylate  2-hydroxy-3-oxoadipate + CO2

The two substrates of this enzyme are 2-oxoglutarate and glyoxylate, whereas its two products are 2-hydroxy-3-oxoadipate and CO2.

This enzyme belongs to the family of transferases, specifically those transferring aldehyde or ketonic groups (transaldolases and transketolases, respectively).  Other names in common use include 2-hydroxy-3-oxoadipate glyoxylate-lyase (carboxylating), alpha-ketoglutaric-glyoxylic carboligase, and oxoglutarate: glyoxylate carboligase.  This enzyme participates in glyoxylate and dicarboxylate metabolism.  It employs one cofactor, thiamin diphosphate.

References

 
 
 

EC 2.2.1
Thiamine enzymes
Enzymes of unknown structure